Christian Kipfer (19 December 1921 – 2009) was a Swiss gymnast who competed in the 1948 Summer Olympics.

References

1921 births
2009 deaths
Swiss male artistic gymnasts
Olympic gymnasts of Switzerland
Gymnasts at the 1948 Summer Olympics
Olympic silver medalists for Switzerland
Olympic bronze medalists for Switzerland
Olympic medalists in gymnastics
Medalists at the 1948 Summer Olympics